Atlantic Fleet may refer to:
 Atlantic Fleet (United Kingdom)
 United States Atlantic Fleet, now the U.S. Fleet Forces Command

See also
 Maritime Forces Atlantic in the Canadian Forces